What a Life is a 1939 American comedy film directed by Theodore Reed and starring Jackie Cooper, Betty Field, John Howard, Janice Logan, Vaughan Glaser, Lionel Stander, and Hedda Hopper. Written by Charles Brackett and Billy Wilder, the film was released on October 6, 1939, by Paramount Pictures.

This is the first in a series of eleven Henry Aldrich films (1939-1944) based on the leading character from the radio series The Aldrich Family

Plot

Henry (Jackie Cooper) is falsely accused of making trouble at school. He must clear himself.

Cast

References

External links 
 
 

1939 films
1939 comedy-drama films
The Aldrich Family films
American black-and-white films
American comedy-drama films
American films based on plays
Films directed by Theodore Reed
Paramount Pictures films
1930s English-language films
1930s American films